Phrae is a town (thesaban mueang) in northern Thailand, capital of Phrae Province.
The town occupies tambon Nai Wiang of Mueang Phrae District. It has an area of nine kilometres2 and a population of 17,971 (2005). Phrae is 555 km north of Bangkok by road.

Geography
The town is mostly built on the east side of the river, but some outlying parts are built on the west side of the river and are connected to the main part by bridges.

At Phae Muang Phi, a few kilometres north of Phrae, there is an impressive landscape of mushroom rocks and distinctive pillars shaped by natural erosive action.

Climate
Phrae has a tropical savanna climate (Köppen climate classification Aw). Winters are dry and warm. The monsoon season runs from May through October, with heavy rain and somewhat cooler temperatures during the day, although nights remain warm.

Culture
Wat Chorm Sawan and Wat Phra That Cho Hae are two important Buddhist temples in Phrae. The latter is on a hill, nine km away from the town center.

Transportation
The main road through Phrae is Route 101, which begins in Nan to the north, passes through Phrae, and leads to Sawankhalok, Sukhothai, and finally Kamphaeng Phet.

Phrae Airport is a small airport in Mueang Mo, on the east side of town. It handles only domestic flights from Don Mueang (DMK).

References

External links

Populated places in Phrae province
Cities and towns in Thailand